The Itni River is a river in the West New Britain Province of New Britain. It is approximately 19.404 miles long.

West New Britain Province